The Okhota (from an Even word окат (okat) meaning "river") is a river in Khabarovsk Krai which flows south to the Sea of Okhotsk near the port town of Okhotsk.

To the east is the parallel Kukhtuy River and then the Kukhtuy Range. To the west is the short Urak River and to the north of it, the Yudoma Range. North of its headwaters, on the other side of the Suntar-Khayata Range, the Taryn-Yuryakh river runs north to join the Indigirka River near Oymyakon.

Course
First a mountain stream, the river later flows along with the river Kukhtuy in a wide valley between Yudoma and Kukhtuy Ranges to join the Kukhtuy to form the harbor of Okhotsk, a natural harbour of the Sea of Okhotsk formed by a sand spit. In 1810 the ice-choked river cut a new mouth through the spit at Novoye Ustye.

The banks of the river are mostly forested. There is an important salmon run. The lower reaches of the river are navigable for small craft. The Okhota is frozen from early November to May. Snow cover in the valley can last until late June.

History
In the fur hunting trade, since there are no easy portages to the Okhota, the Russians usually approached Okhotsk from the Urak or the Ulya to the west. The only main route that used the Okhota ran from the "corner" of the Yudoma over the  Okhotsk Portage to the Okhota about 100 kilometres north of its mouth. There was some pasture along the river but not enough to keep many Yakutsk pack-horses over winter. Larch was cut and floated down the river for shipbuilding. Around 1750 there were 37 peasant families and from 1735 a few Yakut cattlemen.

See also
List of rivers of Russia

References

Rivers of Khabarovsk Krai
Drainage basins of the Sea of Okhotsk